James Saurin (c.1760–1842) was an Irish Anglican bishop in the 19th century. He was the last Bishop of Dromore before it was merged with the Diocese of Down and Connor.

He was born in Belfast, the third of the four sons of James Saurin, vicar of Belfast (died 1774) and Jane Duff. William Saurin, Attorney General for Ireland, was his elder brother. The Saurins were of Huguenot extraction, originally from Nimes in France. It was probably the Bishop's grandfather, Louis, who settled in Ireland about 1727 and became Dean of Ardagh; Louis was a brother of the celebrated preacher Jacques Saurin.

Like his brothers, James was educated at Dubourdien's School, a well-regarded private academy in Lisburn.

He married Elizabeth Lyster and had a numerous family, including James, Archdeacon of Dromore from 1832 to 1879; and Colonel William Saurin. William Saurin Lyster, the celebrated Australian actor, was a nephew.

A former Dean of Derry (1812 to 1813), Archdeacon of Dublin (1813 to 1818) and Dean of Cork (1818 to 1819) he was the Bishop of Dromore from 1819 to 1842. He lived mainly at Dun Laoghaire where he died in office on 9 April 1842. He was buried in St. Ann's Church, Dawson Street.

A plaque in Dromore Cathedral praises his 22 years of "mild and paternal authority, fulfilling his duties with affection and constancy". While his brother William was a passionate supporter of the Orange Order and noted for his violent prejudice against Roman Catholics, this tribute suggests that James was more moderate in his religious views.

References

External links

1842 deaths
Deans of Derry
Anglican bishops of Dromore
19th-century Anglican bishops in Ireland
Clergy from Belfast
Irish people of French descent
Year of birth unknown
Year of birth uncertain
Deans of Cork
Archdeacons of Dublin